Turbinidae, the turban snails, are a family of small to large marine gastropod molluscs in the superfamily Trochoidea.

Description
Turbinidae have a strong, thick calcareous operculum readily distinguishing them from the somewhat similar Trochidae or top snails, which have a corneous operculum. This strong operculum serves as a passive defensive structure against predators that try to enter by way of the aperture or that would break the shell at the outer lip. These operculum are rounded ovals that are flat with a swirl design on one side and domed on the other. They are known as Pacific cat's eye or Shiva eye shells or mermaid money, and are used for decorative purposes.

Etymology 
The common name turban snail presumably refers to the shell's similarity in appearance to a turban. However, the scientific name Turbinidae is based on the genus name Turbo, which is Latin for spinning top, a child's toy. The word turbine has a similar derivation.

Taxonomy 
Previously they were classified in the subclass Prosobranchia, in the order Archaeogastropoda in the superfamily Trochacea. Trochaecea is now a synonym for the superfamily Trochoidea. However, this is a quite ancient group of gastropods, probably originating in the Permian period 298 to 250 million years ago. They have typical primitive characters like the nacreous interior of the shell.

2005 taxonomy 
Turbinidae belongs to superfamily Turbinoidea according to the taxonomy of the Gastropoda by Bouchet & Rocroi, 2005).

This family consists of eight following subfamilies (according to the taxonomy of the Gastropoda by Bouchet & Rocroi, 2005):
 Turbininae Rafinesque, 1815 - synonyms: Senectinae Swainson, 1840; Imperatorinae Gray, 1847; Astraliinae H. Adams & A. Adams, 1854; Astraeinae Davies, 1935; Bolmidae Delpey, 1941
 Angariinae Gray, 1857 - synonym: Delphinulinae Stoliczka, 1868
 Colloniinae Cossmann, 1917
 tribe Colloniini Cossmann, 1917 - synonym: Bothropomatinae Thiele, 1924 (inv.); Homalopomatinae Keen, 1960; Petropomatinae Cox, 1960
 tribe † Adeorbisinini Monari, Conti & szabo, 1995
 tribe † Crossostomatini Cox, 1960
 tribe † Helicocryptini Cox, 1960
 Moellerinae Hickman & McLean, 1990
 † Moreanellinae J. C. Fischer & Weber, 1997
 Prisogasterinae Hickman & McLean, 1990 - synonym: "Prisogastrinae" in Bouchet & Rocroi (2005) is a spelling error.
 Skeneinae W. Clark, 1851 - synonym: Delphinoideinae Thiele, 1924
 Tegulinae Kuroda, Habe & Oyama, 1971

2008 taxonomy 

Turbinidae was redefined and moved to the redefined superfamily Trochoidea according to Williams et al. (2008): Angariidae was elevated to family level, Colloniinae was elevated to family Colloniidae within Phasianelloidea, Margaritinae was moved to Turbinidae from Trochidae.

This family consists of five following subfamilies according to Williams et al. (2008):

 Turbininae Rafinesque, 1815 - synonyms: Senectinae Swainson, 1840; Imperatorinae Gray, 1847; Astraliinae H. Adams & A. Adams, 1854; Astraeinae Davies, 1935; Bolmidae Delpey, 1941
 Skeneinae W. Clark, 1851 - synonym: Delphinoideinae Thiele, 1924 (upgraded to the rank of family Skeneidae)
 Margaritinae Thiele, 1924 - tribes are sensu taxonomy of the Gastropoda by Bouchet & Rocroi, 2005) - upgraded to the rank of family Margaritidae
 tribe Margaritini Thiele, 1924 - synonym: Margaritinae Stoliczka, 1868 (inv.)
 tribe Gazini Hickman & McLean, 1990
 tribe Kaiparathinini Marshall, 1993
 Tegulinae Kuroda, Habe & Oyama, 1971: upgraded to the rank of family Tegulidae Kuroda, Habe & Oyama, 1971
 Prisogasterinae Hickman & McLean, 1990

The following subfamilies (sensu Bouchet & Rocroi (2005) classification of subfamilies in Turbinidae) were kept in Turbinidae:
 Moellerinae Hickman & McLean, 1990 -  Moelleria was not included in the molecular studies performed in 2010.
 † Moreanellinae J. C. Fischer & Weber, 1997

Distribution
Turbinids occur in shallow and deep waters. The family has a large distribution, from the tropics to the polar regions, but most of the species live in tropical and subtropical shallow waters.

Genera

Genera in the family Turbinidae include:

Not belonging to any subfamily
 Phanerolepida Dall, 1907
 Tropidomarga Powell, 1951

Turbininae

 Astraea Röding, 1798
 Astralium Link, 1807
 Bellastraea Iredale, 1924
 Bolma Risso, 1826
 Cookia Lesson, 1832
 Guildfordia Gray, 1850
 Lithopoma Gray, 1850
 Lunella Röding, 1798
 Megastraea McLean, 1970
 Modelia Gray, 1850
 Pomaulax Gray, 1850
 Turbo Linnaeus, 1758 - type genus
 Uvanilla Gray, 1850
 Yaronia Mienis, 2011

Prisogasterinae Hickman & McLean, 1990
 Prisogaster  Mörch, 1850

Genera brought into synonymy
 Astrea Link, 1807: synonym of Astraea Röding, 1798
 Agathistoma Olsson & Harbison, 1953: synonym of Tegula Lesson, 1832
 Amyxa Troschel, 1852: synonym of Prisogaster Mörch, 1850
 Calcar Montfort, 1810: synonym of Astralium Link, 1807
 Canthorbis Swainson, 1840: synonym of Astraea Röding, 1798
 Cardinalia Gray, 1842: synonym of Tectus Montfort, 1810
 Crosseia P. Fischer, 1885: synonym of Crossea A. Adams, 1865
 Cyclocantha Swainson, 1840: synonym of Astralium Link, 1807
 Dinassovica Iredale, 1937: synonym of Turbo (Turbo) Linnaeus, 1758 represented as Turbo Linnaeus, 1758
 Distellifer Iredale, 1937: synonym of Astralium Link, 1807
 Foliastralium Habe & Okutani, 1980: synonym of Astralium Link, 1807
 Galeoastraea Habe, 1958: synonym of Bolma Risso, 1826
 Halopsephus Rehder, 1943: synonym of Turbo (Halopsephus) Rehder, 1943 represented as Turbo Linnaeus, 1758
 Harisazaea Habe, 1958: synonym of Bolma Risso, 1826
 Imperator Montfort, 1810: synonym of Astraea Röding, 1798
   † Incilaster Finlay, 1926: synonym of Bolma Risso, 1826
 Livona Gray, 1842: synonym of Cittarium Philippi, 1847
 Lunatica Röding, 1798: synonym of Turbo Linnaeus, 1758
 Macropelmus Gistel, 1848: synonym of Astralium Link, 1807
 Margarita Leach, 1819: synonym of Margarites Gray, 1847
 Micrastraea Cotton, 1939: synonym of Bellastraea Iredale, 1924
 Notosetia Iredale, 1915: synonym of Putilla A. Adams, 1867
 Okinawastraea Habe & Okutani, 1981: synonym of Astralium Link, 1807
 † Oobolma Sacco, 1896 : synonym of Bolma Risso, 1826
 † Ormastralium Sacco, 1896: synonym of Bolma Risso, 1826
 Pachypoma Gray, 1850: synonym of Lithopoma Gray, 1850
 Pagocalcar Iredale, 1937: synonym of Astralium Link, 1807
 Pseudastralium Schepman, 1908: synonym of Bolma Risso, 1826
 Pyramidea Swainson, 1840: synonym of Tectus Montfort, 1810
 Pyramis Schumacher, 1817: synonym of Tectus Montfort, 1810
 Rugastella Iredale, 1937: synonym of Astralium Link, 1807
 Senobolma Okutani, 1964: synonym of Bolma Risso, 1826
 Stella P. Fischer, 1885: synonym of Astralium Link, 1807
 Submargarita Strebel, 1908: synonym of Lissotesta Iredale, 1915
 Tharsiella Bush, 1897: synonym of Cirsonella Angas, 1877
 Trochiscus G.B. Sowerby I, 1838: synonym of Norrisia Bayle, 1880
 † Tylastralium Sacco, 1896: synonym of Bolma Risso, 1826
 Valvatella Gray, 1857: synonym of Margarites Gray, 1847

References

 Marshall, B.A. 1988. Skeneidae, Vitrinellidae and Orbitestellidae (Mollusca: Gastropoda) associated with biogenic substrata from bathyal depths off New Zealand and New South Wales. Journal of Natural History 22(4): 949-1004.
 Vaught, K.C. (1989). A classification of the living Mollusca. American Malacologists: Melbourne, FL (USA). . XII, 195 pp.
 Williams S.T., Karube S. & Ozawa T. (2008) Molecular systematics of Vetigastropoda: Trochidae, Turbinidae and Trochoidea redefined. Zoologica Scripta 37: 483–506.

External links 
 Seashells of New South Wales : Turbinidae
 Seashells of New South Wales: Skeneinae
 Miocene Gastropods and Biostratigraphy of the Kern River Area, California; United States Geological Survey Professional Paper 642 

 
Taxa named by Constantine Samuel Rafinesque